Kneph is a motif in ancient Egyptian religious art, variously a winged egg, a globe surrounded by one or more serpents, or Amun in the form of a serpent called Kematef.  Some Theosophical sources tried to syncretize this motif with the deity Khnum, along with Serapis and Pluto. Under the Greek theonym Chnuphis, this figure adopts a serpent-bodied, lion-headed ("leontoeidic") visage, being particularly common in magical artifacts in Late Antiquity. It is by proxy frequently associated with the Gnostic Demiurge.

References

Further reading

Egyptian mythology
Religious iconography